Cribrihammus rugosus is a species of beetle in the family Cerambycidae. It was described by Dillon and Dillon in 1959. It is known from Tanzania.

References

Endemic fauna of Tanzania
Lamiini
Beetles described in 1959